The First Secretary of the Mari regional branch of the Communist Party of the Soviet Union was the position of highest authority in the Mari AO (1920–1936) and the Mari ASSR (1936–1991) in the Russian SFSR of the Soviet Union. The position was created on February 24, 1921, and abolished on August 25, 1991. The First Secretary was a de facto appointed position usually by the Politburo or the General Secretary himself.

List of First Secretaries of the Mari Communist Party

See also
Mari Autonomous Oblast
Mari Autonomous Soviet Socialist Republic

Notes

Sources
 World Statesmen.org

1921 establishments in Russia
1991 disestablishments in the Soviet Union
Regional Committees of the Communist Party of the Soviet Union
Politics of Mari El